Brian Head is a town in Iron County, Utah, United States. The population was 83 at the 2010 census, a significant decrease from the 2000 figure of 118.

Brian Head is also the location of the Brian Head Ski Resort.

History
The community was originally called "Monument Peak," but was changed to the current name after 1900 for reasons no longer known, although probably related to the name of (or renaming to) Brian Head (mountain), in nearby Dixie National Forest.

In 1965, the Brian Head resort opened.

Geography
According to the United States Census Bureau, the town has a total area of 3.1 square miles (8.0 km2), all land.

It is located on State Route 143 and is east of Interstate 15. Brian Head is approximately three miles north of Cedar Breaks National Monument.

Demographics

As of the census of 2000, there were 118 people, 55 households, and 33 families residing in the town. The population density was 38.1 people per square mile (14.7/km2). There were 912 housing units at an average density of 294.1 per square mile (113.6/km2). The racial makeup of the town was 99.15% White and 0.85% African American. Hispanics or Latinos of any race were 0.85% of the population.

There were 55 households, out of which 18.2% had children under the age of 18 living with them, 49.1% were married couples living together, 1.8% had a female householder with no husband present, and 40.0% were non-families. 38.2% of all households were made up of individuals, and none had someone living alone who was 65 years of age or older. The average household size was 2.15, and the average family size was 2.85.

The age distribution was 22.0% under the age of 18, 4.2% from 18 to 24, 27.1% from 25 to 44, 34.7% from 45 to 64, and 11.9% who were 65 years of age or older. The median age was 43 years. For every 100 females, there were 131.4 males. For every 100 females age 18 and over, there were 130.0 males.

The median income for a household in the town was $44,063, and the median income for a family was $44,375. Males had a median income of $43,750 versus $28,750 for females. The per capita income for the town was $32,647. There were 8.8% of families and 5.4% of the population living below the poverty line, including no under eighteens and none of those over 64.

Climate
According to the Köppen climate classification, Brian Head has an alpine subarctic climate (Dsc). The most snowfall in one month was  during March 1995 and the most during a full year  between July 1997 and June 1998.

Winter temperatures are cold, with 80.3 days each year not topping freezing (a number certainly inflated by the very deep snow cover) and  reached nineteen times in an average winter. The very heavy snow does not ease until May, when temperatures begin to rise above , and May and June are also the driest months.

Summer weather in Brian Head is influenced by the tail end of the North American Monsoon, which provides frequent thunderstorms in July and August, though convection is inhibited by the cool temperatures at Brian Head's extreme altitude. After the monsoon retreats, temperatures rapidly fall during September and October, when snow cover is permanently re-established.

References

External links

 
  Brian Head Chamber of Commerce information

Towns in Iron County, Utah
Towns in Utah
1975 establishments in Utah
Populated places established in 1975